The historic district of Rome was declared World Heritage Site by the United Nations Educational, Scientific and Cultural Organization in 1980. It covers 19,91 km² and is included in 22 rioni with 186.802 inhabitants. There are 25.000 importants archaeological sites and locations.

The 22 rioni are Monti, Trevi, Colonna, Campo Marzio, Ponte, Parione, Regola, Sant'Eustachio, Pigna, Campitelli, Sant'Angelo, Ripa, Trastevere, Borgo, Esquilino, Ludovisi, Sallustiano, Castro Pretorio, Celio, Testaccio, San Saba and Prati.

References

External links
 
 

Historic sites in Italy